

Statistics

Total confirmed cases, active cases, recoveries and deaths

Active cases 

 Confirmed cases by districts 

 Case completion percentage 

 Daily new cases 

 Daily new recovered 

Daily new deaths
Note: On 22 July, 444 previous deaths were added to Chennai district after reconciliation; which are not included in the chart.

 Daily new cases by type of spread 

 Positive sampling rate

Case fatality rate 
The trend of case fatality rate for COVID-19 from 25 March, the day first death in the state was recorded.

Total samples tested 

 Daily new samples tested 

 Plot of new samples tested per day vs new confirmed positive per day

References

External links 
 COVID-19 dashboard
 StopCoronaTN – Department of Health and Family Welfare, Tamil Nadu
 Minister of Health and Family Welfare – Ministry of Health and Family Welfare's homepage
  – National Health Mission Tamil Nadu channel

COVID-19 pandemic in India
Tamil Nadu